Artur Soslanovich Gazdanov (born 26 July 1992) is a Russian professional footballer who plays as a midfielder for Kazakhstani club FC Akzhayik.

Club career
He made his debut in the Russian Second Division for FC Alania-d Vladikavkaz on 26 April 2011 in a game against FC Mashuk-KMV Pyatigorsk and scored a goal on his debut.

He made his Russian Football National League debut for FC KAMAZ Naberezhnye Chelny on 11 July 2015 in a game against FC Gazovik Orenburg.

References

1992 births
Sportspeople from Vladikavkaz
Living people
Russian footballers
Association football midfielders
FC KAMAZ Naberezhnye Chelny players
FC Volgar Astrakhan players
FC Spartak Vladikavkaz players
FC Avangard Kursk players
FC Tyumen players
FC Akron Tolyatti players
FC Akzhayik players
Russian Second League players
Russian First League players
Kazakhstan Premier League players
Russian expatriate footballers
Expatriate footballers in Kazakhstan
Russian expatriate sportspeople in Kazakhstan